The 10th Infantry Division is a formation of the Bangladesh Army and one of the three divisions of Chittagong Division. It's located in the city of Cox's Bazar in southeastern Bangladesh. It was formed as part of the development vision of Bangladesh Armed Forces Forces Goal 2030.

History 
Chittagong division has a history of ethnic and religious strife. With a purpose of tackling the corresponding problem and protecting the new maritime boundary, it was necessary to increase army's capability in the area. Considering this, initiative and corresponding measures were taken to form an infantry division as it was also part of the development vision of Bangladesh Armed Forces Forces Goal 2030.

On 19 April 2014, Prime Minister Sheikh Hasina confirmed the approval for a new cantonment in Ramu.

Sheikh Hasina formally announced formation of the 10th Infantry Division, as well the brigade and regiments under its command by raising the flag on 1 March 2015.

Flag of seven units including that of the 2nd Infantry Brigade was hoisted on 10 March 2016. Flag hoisting ceremony of the seven newly formed units was held on 9 February 2017. Flag hoisting program of 4 new units was held on 20 February 2018.

Formation 
There are two infantry brigades and an artillery brigade, comprising nine infantry regiments and four artillery regiments respectively. Two engineering battalions and other various units including SSD Ramu and two field workshop units are under the supervision of the 10th Infantry Division. Major General Fakhrul Ahsan is the current General Officer Commanding of the division.

Combat Arms
 Artillery
 10 Artillery Brigade
 9 Field Regiment Artillery
 27 Field Regiment Artillery
 28 Medium Regiment Artillery
 Div Locating Artillery
 Armoured:
 16 Cavalry Regiment
 Infantry:
 2 Infantry Brigade
 97 Infantry Brigade
 8 East Bengal Regiment
 24 East Bengal Regiment
 60 East Bengal Regiment
 63 East Bengal Regiment
 24 Bangladesh Infantry Regiment
 36 Bangladesh Infantry Regiment
 37 Bangladesh Infantry Regiment
 38 Bangladesh Infantry Regiment
 39 Bangladesh Infantry Regiment
Combat support 
 Ordnance Corps
 509 Division Ordnance Company
 10 Independent Ammunition Platoon
 Corps of Signals (Sig)
 9 Signal Battalion
 39 Signal Battalion
 Corps of Engineers
 6 Engineer Battalion
Combat Service support
 Army Medical Corps
 55 field ambulance

References 

Infantry divisions of Bangladesh
Military units and formations established in 2015